The 2020 Supercopa do Brasil was the 3rd Supercopa do Brasil, an annual football match played between the champions of the 2019 Campeonato Brasileiro Série A and 2019 Copa do Brasil. The 2020 edition marked the return of the tournament, which since 1991 was not disputed.

The match was played at the Estádio Nacional Mané Garrincha in Brasília on 16 February 2020. Flamengo and Athletico Paranaense qualified after winning the 2019 Campeonato Brasileiro Série A tournament and the 2019 Copa do Brasil, respectively.

Flamengo won the match 3–0, securing their first tournament title.

Qualified teams

Match

Details

References 

Supercopa do Brasil
2020 in Brazilian football
CR Flamengo matches
Club Athletico Paranaense matches